Perigomphus is a genus of dragonfly in the family Gomphidae. It contains the following species:
 Perigomphus angularis Tennessen, 2011
 Perigomphus pallidistylus Belle, 1972 – pegtail

References

Gomphidae
Anisoptera genera
Taxonomy articles created by Polbot